Kléber Ramos da Silva (born 24 August 1985) is a Brazilian cyclist, who currently rides for Brazilian amateur team Unifunvic Pindamondangadaba.

Career
Ramos rode the road race at the 2016 Olympic Games in Rio de Janeiro, but a few days after the race it was revealed that he had tested positive for doping in a pre-games test.

Doping case
On 12 August 2016 the UCI announced that Ramos was provisionally suspended after a doping sample of his from 31 July 2016 had been found positive for CERA. He was later given a four-year ban, and is suspended until August 2020.

Major results

2005
 1st Stage 4 Volta a Porto Alegre
2007
 National Road Championships
1st  Under-23 road race
3rd Road race
 1st Stage 6 Tour do Brasil
 4th Overall Volta do Paraná
1st Stage 4
 10th Copa América de Ciclismo
2008
 1st Stage 6 Giro do Interior de São Paulo
 5th Copa América de Ciclismo
2009
 1st Stage 10 Vuelta del Uruguay
 1st Stage 2 Tour de Santa Catarina
 5th Prova Ciclística 9 de Julho
2010
 4th Prova Ciclística 9 de Julho
2012
 1st Overall Tour do Rio
1st Stage 3
 1st Stage 3 Giro do Interior de São Paulo
 1st Stage 5 Rutas de América
2013
 3rd Copa América de Ciclismo
 5th Overall Tour do Rio
2014
 3rd Overall Tour do Rio
1st  Mountains classification
2015
 1st Stage 6 Tour de San Luis
 2nd Overall Tour do Rio
1st Stage 4
 7th International Road Cycling Challenge
2016
 2nd Road race, National Road Championships
 2nd Overall Volta Ciclística Internacional do Rio Grande do Sul
2021
 1st  Road race, National Road Championships

References

External links

1985 births
Living people
Brazilian male cyclists
Brazilian road racing cyclists
Cyclists at the 2016 Summer Olympics
Olympic cyclists of Brazil
Doping cases in cycling
Brazilian sportspeople in doping cases
20th-century Brazilian people
21st-century Brazilian people